Dasara may refer to:

Festivals 
In South India, the Nine-day festival of Navratri
In Mysore, Mysore Dasara
Dasara Elephants, an integral part of the Mysore Dasara festival
In Madikeri, Madikeri Dasara
In Mangalore, Mangalore Dasara
In Nepal, the 15-day festival of Dashain
In Northern India, the tenth day of the festival, Vijayadashami
In Himachal Pradesh, a seven-day festival starting on that day, Kullu Dussehra
In Eastern India, to the Vijayadashami day of Durga Puja

Art and entertainment 

 Dasara (film), an Indian Telugu-language film